311P/PanSTARRS also known as P/2013 P5 (PanSTARRS) is an active asteroid (object with properties of both asteroids and comets) discovered by Bryce T. Bolin using the Pan-STARRS telescope on 27 August 2013. Observations made by the Hubble Space Telescope revealed that it had six comet-like tails. The tails are suspected to be streams of material ejected by the asteroid as a result of a rubble pile asteroid spinning fast enough to remove material from it. This is similar to 331P/Gibbs, which was found to be a quickly-spinning rubble pile as well.

Three-dimensional models constructed by Jessica Agarwal of the Max Planck Institute for Solar System Research in Lindau, Germany, showed that the tails could have formed by a series of periodic impulsive dust-ejection events, radiation pressure from the sun then stretched the dust into streams.

Precovery images from the Sloan Digital Sky Survey from 2005 were found, showing negligible cometary activity in 2005.

Characteristics
The first images taken by Pan-STARRS revealed that the object had an unusual appearance: asteroids generally appear as small points of light, but P/2013 P5 was identified as a fuzzy-looking object by astronomers. The multiple tails were observed by the Hubble Space Telescope on 10 September 2013, Hubble later returned to the asteroid on 23 September, its appearance had totally changed. It looked as if the entire structure had swung around. The Hubble Space Telescope continued to track the object through 11 February 2014. The comet-like appearance has resulted in the asteroid being named as a comet. The object has a low orbital inclination and always stays outside the orbit of Mars.

Possible satellite 
On April 19th, 2018 observations based on light curvature suggested a possible satellite around 311P/PANSTARRS approaching 200 meters.  If true this would be one of the few minor planets designated as a comet known to harbor a satellite.

See also
354P/LINEAR (P/2010 A2)
Yarkovsky–O'Keefe–Radzievskii–Paddack effect (aka YORP effect)

References

External links 
 The Multi-Tailed Main-Belt Comet P/2013 P5 (Remanzacco Observatory : 8 November 2013)
 Confused Asteroid Sprouts Tails… Six of Them! (Phil Plait : 8 November 2013)
 Orbit diagram from JPL Small-Body Database

Periodic comets
0311
Active asteroids

Comets in 2013
20130827